The 1958 Fresno State Bulldogs football team represented Fresno State College—now known as California State University, Fresno—as a member of the California Collegiate Athletic Association (CCAA) during the 1958 NCAA College Division football season. Led by Clark Van Galder in his seventh and final season as head coach, Fresno State compiled an overall record of 5–5 with a mark of 4–1 in conference play, winning the CCAA title. The Bulldogs played home games at Ratcliffe Stadium on the campus of Fresno City College in Fresno, California.

Schedule

Notes

References

Fresno State
Fresno State Bulldogs football seasons
California Collegiate Athletic Association football champion seasons
Fresno State Bulldogs football